Fulgens radiatur (English: 'The Radiant Light') issued March 21, 1947 is an encyclical of Pope Pius XII on Saint Benedict.  It was written in the context of the heavy destruction of the Benedictine Monte Cassino monastery during the Battle of Monte Cassino in World War II.

References

External links 
 Fulgens radiatur on the Vatican website

1947 documents
Encyclicals of Pope Pius XII
March 1947 events
1947 in Christianity